__notoc__

Nauli is one of the kriyas or shatkarmas, preliminary purifications, used in yoga. The exercise is claimed to serve the cleaning of the abdominal region (digestive organs, small intestine) and is based on a massage of the internal belly organs by a circular movement of the abdominal muscles. It is performed standing with the feet apart and the knees bent.

The 15th century Hatha Yoga Pradipika claims that Nauli (magically) removes all diseases.

Nauli is an exercise of classical hatha yoga; it is not often taught in yoga as exercise. There are four steps, which are learned one after another: 

 the abdominal lock, uddiyana bandha: the lungs are emptied, and the abdomen is pulled inwards and upwards under the lower edge of the ribcage
 madhyana nauli: only the central muscles of the abdomen are contracted
 vama nauli: only the left muscles of the abdomen are contracted
 daksina nauli: only the right muscles of the abdomen are contracted.

See also 
 Vacuum exercise

References

Sources

External links 
 Definitions of Nauli
 nauli.org: Nauli references, education, and discussion
 nauli
 research paper
 yogalearn
 /tantricacademy

Kriyas
Shatkarmas
Sanskrit words and phrases